The 16th Busan International Film Festival was held from October 6 to October 14, 2011 at the Busan Cinema Center and was hosted by actresses Uhm Ji-won and Ye Ji-won, making it the first year to be hosted by two women.

The 16th BIFF also marks the first year for Lee Yong-kwan as the festival director after the retirement of its founding director, Kim Dong-ho and is also the first to take place at the Busan Cinema Center which was opened on September 29, 2011.

A total of 307 films from 70 countries were invited to participate in the festival, with 86 world premieres and 39 international premieres. The event had a total audience of 196,177.

Program
† World Premiere
†† International Premiere

Opening Film

Gala Presentation

A Window on Asian Cinema

New Currents

Korean Cinema Today - Panorama

Korean Cinema Today - Vision

Korean Cinema Retrospective

Kim Kee-duk, On the Front Line of Korean Genre Films

World Cinema

Flash Forward

Wide Angle

Korean Short Film Competition

Asian Short Film Competition

Short Film Showcase

Documentary Competition

Documentary Showcase

Animation Showcase

Open Cinema

Special Program in Focus

Yonfan, A Touch of Sensuality

Extreme Portuguese Cinema: Six Auteurs in Focus

Asian Western: Man of the East

Australian Cinema: Another Face of Australian Cinema

Asian Western: Man of the East

Special Screening

Midnight Passion

Closing Film

Awards 
New Currents Award
Mourning - Morteza Farshbaf (Iran)
Nino - Loy Arcenas (Philippines)
Flash Forward Award
LA-BAS - A Criminal Education - Guido Lombardi (Italy)
Sonje Award
See You Tomorrow - Lee Woo-jung (South Korea)
Thug Beram - Venkat Amudhan (India)
Special Mention: Bugging Heaven; Listen to Her - Oh Hyun-ju (South Korea)
Special Mention: DIY Encouragement - Kohei Yoshino (Japan)
BIFF Mecenat Award
Sea of Butterfly - Park Bae-il (South Korea)
Shoji & Takao - Ide Yoko (Japan)
KNN Movie Award
Watch Indian Circus - Mangesh Hadawale (India)
FIPRESCI Award
Mourning - Morteza Farshbaf (Iran)
NETPAC Award
The King of Pigs - Yeon Sang-ho (South Korea)
Busan Cinephile Award
The Twin - Gustav Danielsson (Sweden)
Citizen Reviewers' Award
Romance Joe - Lee Kwang-kuk (South Korea)
DGK Award
Director: Yeon Sang-ho (The King of Pigs) (South Korea)
Actor: Ha Hyun-kwan (Beautiful Miss Jin) (South Korea)
Actress: Han Song-hee, Hwang Jung-min (Jesus Hospital) (South Korea)
CGV Movie Collage Award
The King of Pigs - Yeon Sang-ho (South Korea)
Asian Filmmaker of the Year
Tsui Hark (Hong Kong)
Korean Cinema Award
Julietta Sichel (Czech Republic)

References

External links
Official site

Busan International Film Festival
Busan International Film Festival, 2011
Busan International Film Festival, 2011
Busan International Film Festival, 2011
2011 festivals in South Korea